Hamble may refer to:
 The River Hamble in Hampshire, England
 Hamble aerodrome on the banks of the River Hamble.
Hamble-Warsash Ferry, a ferry service on the River Hamble
 Hamble-le-Rice, a village on the river Hamble, close to the city of Southampton, England
Hamble railway station, serving Hamble-le-Rice
 Hamble Aerostructures Sports & Social Club F.C., an association football team in Hamble-le-Rice
 Hamble, a doll featured on the BBC children's programme Play School and its Australian adaptation
 Fairey Hamble Baby, a seaplane designed by Fairey Aviation